The Secret is a 2016 Northern Irish ITV mini-series based on Let This Be Our Secret, Belfast journalist Deric Henderson's account of the double murder of Lesley Howell and Constable Trevor Buchanan, whose bodies were discovered in a fume-filled car in the garage of a property in Castlerock, County Londonderry, in Northern Ireland in May 1991.

The drama stars James Nesbitt as killer dentist Colin Howell, is written by BAFTA-winning writer Stuart Urban and is directed by Nick Murphy. The producer is Jonathan Curling, and the executive producers are Hat Trick Productions' Mark Redhead and Stuart Urban.

It was broadcast from 29 April to 20 May 2016 in four episodes. The production was criticised by Howell's daughter, for the portrayal of her mother, and for 'exploiting a tragedy'. The drama was BAFTA nominated as Best Drama Miniseries. It won the Royal Television Society award for Best Drama, Northern Ireland and was nominated at The Broadcast Awards as Best Drama.

Cast 
 James Nesbitt as Colin Howell 
 Genevieve O'Reilly as Hazel Buchanan 
 Laura Pyper as Lesley Howell
 Glen Wallace as Trevor Buchanan  
 Jason Watkins as Pastor John Hansford 
 James Greene as Grandpa Harry Clarke
 Jonathan Harden as DC Devine
 David Pears as Andy Comerford 
 Ali White as Hilary McAuley  
 Eileen McCloskey as Dental Receptionist  
 Riley Hamilton as Matthew Howell  
 Nina Woods as Lauren Howell 
 Murray Speeers as Daniel Howell 
 Jack Erdis as Andrew Buchanan
 Sophie Mellotte as Lisa Buchanan

Plot

Episode 1 
In 1990, married dentist Colin meets married teacher Hazel, and they start having an affair. Colin assures her their love is a gift from God, and he wants them to act on it.

Episode 2 
Lesley (Colin's wife) receives an inheritance from her father. Colin asphyxiates Lesley and Hazel's husband Trevor whilst they sleep. He then stages a suicide pact.

Episode 3 
The coroner gives a verdict of suicide. Hazel and Colin continue their relationship, but Hazel feels guilty and can only have sex with Colin whilst heavily drugged. Eventually the relationship ends and they marry new partners. Colin's son Matthew dies. Colin concludes this is a punishment by God.

Episode 4 
Colin loses a fortune in a scam, and confesses to the murders. He and Hazel are both imprisoned.

References

External links
 Broadcast Magazine on The Secrets ratings

2016 British television series debuts
2016 British television series endings
2010s British drama television series
ITV television dramas
2010s British crime television series
2010s British television miniseries
English-language television shows
Television series by Hat Trick Productions
Television series by ITV Studios
Television series set in the 1990s
Television shows set in Northern Ireland